Blackjack is a constellation of small American surveillance satellites to be launched starting in 2022. The Blackjack program was started by DARPA in 2017, with contracts awarded in 2020. The Blackjack constellation will replace or complement larger systems such as Misty and KH-11. These new orbiters will be cheaper, more numerous and short-lived than existing systems.

The new devices can be launched more covertly, may be more difficult to track and attack, and would be constantly replaced by new versions as older ones fall back to Earth. Each would have limited capabilities, but would operate as part of a constellation of twenty satellites networked together. Costs would be reduced by using the common commercial satellite buses now available. In mid 2020, open sources indicated the first two satellites would be launched in the third quarter of 2021. As of January 2022, the first four satellites of the constellation are scheduled to launch in fall 2022.

See also 

 Enhanced Imaging System
 Future Imagery Architecture

References 

DARPA projects
National Reconnaissance Office satellites
Reconnaissance satellites of the United States
Small satellites